Deadhorse is an unincorporated community located within the CDP of Prudhoe Bay in North Slope Borough, Alaska, United States, along the North Slope near the Arctic Ocean. The town consists mainly of facilities for the workers and companies that operate at the nearby Prudhoe Bay Oil Field. Limited accommodation is also available for tourists.

The permanent population is variously listed as being between 25 and 50 residents.  Temporary residents (employed by various firms with local interests) can range as high as 3,000.

Companies with facilities in Deadhorse service Prudhoe Bay, nearby oil fields, and the Trans-Alaska Pipeline System (TAPS), which brings oil from Prudhoe Bay to Valdez on the south-central Alaska coast. Facilities in Deadhorse are built entirely on man-made gravel pads and usually consist of pre-fabricated modules shipped to Deadhorse via barge or air cargo.

History 
The Prudhoe Bay, Alaska, area was developed to house personnel, provide support for drilling operations, and transport oil to the Alaskan pipeline. Prior to 1977, oil seeps (small pores or fissure networks through which liquid petroleum emerges at the surface of the land) on the Arctic coastal plain had caught the attention of the U.S. petroleum interests.  The high school is Dead Horse High School. The U.S. Navy drilled for oil between 1944 and 1953 with little success. In 1967, after several attempts at drilling for oil, oil company mergers, and competitive bidding for state lease sales, the Prudhoe Bay oil field was discovered.

Sources conflict on the origin of the area's name. The most cited theory appears to be that the area takes its name from a local business prominent in the late 1960s and 1970s, the "Dead Horse Haulers" trucking company. How the trucking company got its name remains in dispute.

In February 2023, a "high altitude object" about the size of a small car was shot down near the area after a decision by President Joe Biden.

Demographics

Deadhorse first appeared on the 1970 U.S. Census as an unincorporated village. It was made a census-designated place (CDP) in 1980. It appeared last on the 1990 census. After 2000, it was merged into the Prudhoe Bay CDP.

Tourism and wildlife 

Tourists traveling to Deadhorse and Prudhoe Bay typically take tour buses from Fairbanks via the James Dalton Highway, a two-day journey with an overnight stop in Coldfoot. During the summer months, visitors can arrange for tours to the Arctic Ocean via a guided tour only.  There is no longer any public Arctic Ocean access from Deadhorse.  All tours must be booked 24 hours in advance to allow time for background checks on all passengers going through the oilfield check point.  Tourists can also experience the midnight sun due to Deadhorse's location above the Arctic Circle. In winter, the opposite phenomenon, polar night, occurs.

The area often features large herds of caribou and over 200 bird and waterfowl species, including geese, swans, gulls and eagles. Other indigenous wildlife include Arctic foxes, Arctic ground squirrels, grizzly bears, polar bears, musk oxen, and Arctic hares.

Because alcoholic beverages are not sold in Deadhorse, a humorous slogan for the town is "All that far and still no bar."

The town serves as a start/end or turn-around point of several motorcycle-riding challenges offered by the Iron Butt Association. One of these, the Ultimate Coast to Coast, gives riders 30 days to travel between Deadhorse and Key West (the southernmost city in the contiguous United States) in either direction.

Climate 
Like all of the North Slope, Deadhorse features a cold and dry tundra climate (Köppen ET), as even the hottest month, July, has a daily average temperature of only , although Deadhorse reaches  on average once every four years, Deadhorse averages 
four days per year where temperatures reaches at or above , since 1968 the only years that fail to reach that mark was 1972 and 1980. Precipitation is very light, averaging only , including only  of snow – less snowfall than even the warmest places in the Alaska Panhandle like Ketchikan. As the area is located in USDA Plant Hardiness Zone 2, temperatures below  can be expected during the height of winter.

Longest day: 63 days, 23 hours, 40 minutes (12:09 a.m. on May 20 to 11:18 p.m. on July 22)
Shortest day: 45 min (11:42 a.m. to 12:27 p.m. on November 24)
Longest night: 54 days, 22 hours, 51 min (12:27 p.m. on November 24 to 11:18 a.m. on January 18)
Shortest night: 26 min (11:43 p.m. on May 19 to 12:09 a.m. on May 20)
Highest recorded temperature:  on 13 July 2016
Lowest recorded temperature:  on 27 January 1989
Highest wind speed recorded:  on 25 February 1989
Official lowest wind chill:  on 28 January 1989 (air temperature of ) and wind speed of

Health care 
Deadhorse (including Prudhoe Bay) is classified as an isolated town/Sub-Regional Center. It is found in EMS Region 6A in the North Slope Region. Emergency Services have limited highway, coastal, and airport access. Emergency service is provided by paid EMS service and Fairweather Deadhorse Medical Clinic. Auxiliary health care is provided by oil company medical staff and the Greater Prudhoe Bay Fire Dept. Individuals requiring hospital care are usually transported to the nearest hospital/medical center, Sammuel Simmonds Memorial Hospital, in Utqiagvik, Alaska. Because no roads connect Deadhorse to Utqiagvik, individuals are transported by plane or helicopter (an approximately 45 minute flight).

In popular culture

Comic books 
A highly fictionalized version of Deadhorse, AK appears in the Deadhorse comic book series, by Eric Grissom, Phil Sloan, Marissa Louise, and David Halvorson.

Television 
Deadhorse is the subject of the second episode of America's Toughest Jobs
Deadhorse is featured on the third through sixth seasons of Ice Road Truckers, a reality television series airing on the History Channel; it dramatizes trucking on the Dalton Highway and often features truckers transporting equipment to the oil companies located in or around the Prudhoe Bay area.
It is briefly featured in the first, second, and third seasons of the BBC's Life Below Zero.
It is featured in the first episode of the BBC's World's Most Dangerous Roads
It is featured in the X-Files, season 2, episode 17: "End Game".

Image gallery

References

External links 

 Deadhorse Alaska website
 Deadhorse local weather
 Dalton Highway

See also 
Dead horse (disambiguation)

Unincorporated communities in North Slope Borough, Alaska
Unincorporated communities in Alaska
Populated places of the Arctic United States
Populated coastal places in Alaska on the Arctic Ocean